Joint Task Force Liberia was a joint task force formed from August to October 2003 in response to the crisis that developed during the Second Liberian Civil War.  The ongoing civil war destabilized the area and created a large number of refugees as rebel forces closed in on Monrovia and took over Bushrod Island.  As a result, the Freeport of Monrovia closed, causing food shortages.

As the crisis unfolded, U.S. Ambassador to Liberia John W. Blaney requested military assistance.  U.S. Secretary of Defense Donald Rumsfeld approved deployment of U.S. forces on July 20, 2003 and soon afterwards, the United States armed forces established Joint Task Force Liberia.

Formation and deployment of the task force

In 2003, the 56th Rescue Squadron of the 85th Group, U.S. Air Force, from Keflavik, Iceland, deployed to Liberia as part of JTF-Liberia.  It saved lives by extracting people from the United States Embassy in Monrovia.

In July, Marines from a forward deployed Fleet Antiterrorism Security Team (FAST) left Naval Station Rota, Spain for Liberia. The FAST platoon reinforced the embassy security and began non-combatant evacuation operations. After a month of the platoon of Marines being alone to defend the Embassy Compound, the 26th MEU, which had steamed at full speed for 2 weeks from the Horn of Africa finally arrived off shore.

Members of the Southern European Task Force formed the headquarters element of the task force while the Iwo Jima Amphibious Ready Group with the 26th Marine Expeditionary Unit provided the operational forces.

On August 14, 2003, the Iwo Jima Amphibious Ready Group conducted an amphibious operation and landed about 150 Marines at Roberts International Airport and another 50 at the Freeport of Monrovia on Bushrod Island. Nigerian Army forces also deployed as part of an ECOMIL, an Economic Community of West African States temporary intervention force. The Joint Task Force Liberia and ECOWAS forces began to stabilize the area and the United Nations brought in humanitarian aid.

President Charles Taylor left the country soon afterwards under pressure from the international community, and the stage was set for the arrival of first an ECOWAS interim peacekeeping force, ECOMIL, and then the UN peacekeeping force the United Nations Mission in Liberia.

Notes

Further reading
Colonel Blair A. Ross (U.S. Army), 'The U.S. Joint Task Force Experience in Liberia,' Military Review, May–June 2005, p. 60-67. at https://web.archive.org/web/20121119101218/http://usacac.leavenworth.army.mil/CAC/milreview/download/English/MayJun05/ross.pdf
Geraci (2005). Expert Knowledge in a Joint Task Force Headquarters. JFQ. at  http://www.dtic.mil/doctrine/jel/jfq_pubs/1238.pdf
Naval Peacekeeping and Humanitarian Operations: Stability from the Sea, chapter note 26, pp. 167–168

Joint task forces of the United States Armed Forces
Military units and formations established in 2003
History of Liberia